John Tanner Park, formerly known as John Tanner State Park, is a  Carroll County park located between Carrollton and Mount Zion.  The park is named after John Tanner, a local businessman who operated the park from 1954 to 1971.  He operated it as Tanner's Beach. The park itself is well known for its water-friendly recreation. It contains two lakes, one  and the other , and the largest sand beach of any Georgia state park.  There is also a walking and nature trail for land-dwellers. It became managed by Carroll County in 2010 and was purchased by Carroll County in 2013.

Facilities
32 Tent/Trailer/RV Sites
4 Picnic Shelters
2 Group Shelters
Pioneer Camping
Group Lodge
Motor Lodge
Miniature Golf Course

Events
Junior Sportsman Bonanza in March.

Halloween Heyday in October.

A Very Carroll Christmas in December.

References

External links

State parks of Georgia (U.S. state)
Protected areas of Carroll County, Georgia